Julien is a studio album of songs by Dalida recorded and released in 1973.

Track listing
 Julien
 Ô Seigneur Dieu
 Je suis malade
 Vado via
 Paroles, paroles
 Non ce n'est pas pour moi
 Il venait d'avoir 18 ans
 Soleil d'un nouveau monde
 Mais il y a l'accordéon
 Le temps de mon père
 Rien qu'un homme de plus

Singles
1973 Paroles, paroles
1973 Mais il y a l'accordéon
1973 Vado via
1973 Julien
1974 Gigi l'amoroso (Gigi l'amour) / Il venait d'avoir 18 ans

References
 Dalida Official Website

External links
 Dalida Official Website "Discography" section

Dalida albums
1973 albums